Akhaura is an upazila of Brahmanbaria District, a district under Chattogram, Bangladesh. Akhaura Upazila has an area of 99.28 km2.  The main river that run through this upazila is the Titas River. Akhaura played an important historical role during both World War II and Liberation War of Bangladesh.

The administration of Akhaura thana, now an upazila, was established in 1976. The upazila includes one municipality, five union parishads, 107 mouzas and 113 villages.

History

During the Indo-Pakistani War of 1971 for the liberation of Bangladesh, Pakistan Army planners predicted India would launch its main attack in the east along the Akhaura–Brahmanbaria axis; however, the army had no troops in this area, so the 27th brigade at Mymensingh was moved to Akhaura, except for two battalions (which became the 93rd brigade) that were retained for the defence of Mymensingh. Pakistan Army's 93,000 troops unconditionally surrendered to the Indian Army and India's local ally Mukti Bahini on 16 December 1971. This day and event is commemorated as the Bijoy Dibos in Bangladesh and Vijay Diwas in India.

Demographics
As of the 2011 Bangladesh Census, there were 145,215 inhabitants across 27,831 households in Akhaura Upazila. There were 93 males (48.3%) to every 100 females (51.7%). Children (0-14) made up 40.7% of the population. The vast majority of the population were adherents of Islam (94.2%), with 5.8% being adherents of Hinduism. The average literacy rate was 52.8% for those aged 7 and above, compared to a national average of 47.1%.

Points of interest
 Kharampur Mazar Sharif, the mausoleum of Hazrat Syed Ahmad Gesudaraz (R), is a pilgrimage site for devotees.

Administration
Akhaura Upazila is divided into Akhaura Municipality and five union parishads: Dakshin Akhaura, Dharkhar, Monionda, Mogra, and Uttar Akhaura. The union parishads are subdivided into 86 mauzas and 112 villages.

Akhaura Municipality is subdivided into 9 wards and 23 mahallas.

Transport

Plans are underway to have Akhaura connected to Agartala, India via railway by 2017.

In 2013–14, Bangladesh exported TK 2.26 billion through the Akhaura Land Port to India.

Education

There are several schools and colleges in Akhaura. As in 2016, there is no university in Akhaura upazila. According to Banglapedia, Bangladesh Railway Government High School, founded in 1920, is a notable secondary school.

See also
 Upazilas of Bangladesh
 Districts of Bangladesh
 Divisions of Bangladesh

References

Towns in Bangladesh
Bangladesh–India border crossings
Upazilas of Brahmanbaria District